Ersela Kurti (born 1990) is an Albanian model and beauty pageant titleholder who was crowned Miss World Albania 2013.

Early life
Ersela Kurti was born and raised in Albania's capital city of Tirana. She is currently studying for her master's degree as a student of law. Between her studies, she works as a dancer on TV productions and one of her ambition is to become a presenter on Albanian TV channels.

She gained popularity in the Albania, due her ballerina career at TV Klan. Later she went to the University to study and neglected her career.

Pageantry

Miss Universe Albania 2013
Kurti was crowned Miss World Albania 2013

Personal life
Kurti was engaged to an Albanian politician which was an adviser in the Albanian government.

References 

Living people
Albanian beauty pageant winners
Albanian female models
1990 births
Miss World 2013 delegates